Pseudarchaster is a genus of echinoderms belonging to the family Pseudarchasteridae.

The genus has almost cosmopolitan distribution.

Species:

Pseudarchaster alascensis 
Pseudarchaster discus 
Pseudarchaster dissonus 
Pseudarchaster diversigranulatus 
Pseudarchaster garricki 
Pseudarchaster gracilis 
Pseudarchaster hispidus 
Pseudarchaster jordani 
Pseudarchaster macdougalli 
Pseudarchaster microceramus 
Pseudarchaster motutaraensis 
Pseudarchaster mozaicus 
Pseudarchaster myobrachius 
Pseudarchaster obtusus 
Pseudarchaster oligoporus 
Pseudarchaster ornatus 
Pseudarchaster parelii 
Pseudarchaster pectinifer 
Pseudarchaster portlandicus 
Pseudarchaster pulcher 
Pseudarchaster pusillus 
Pseudarchaster roseus 
Pseudarchaster tessellatus 
Pseudarchaster verrilli

References

Pseudarchasteridae
Asteroidea genera